Bulvar Rokossovskogo is a station on the Moscow Central Circle of the Moscow Metro.

Name
Prior to opening, the station's named was changed by the city from Otkrytoye Shosse.

Transfer
The station offers out-of-station transfers to Bulvar Rokossovskogo of the Sokolnicheskaya Line.

Gallery

References

External links 
 
 Бульвар Рокоссовского mkzd.ru 

Moscow Metro stations
Railway stations in Russia opened in 2016
Moscow Central Circle stations